The Rocky Valley Dam is located on the Bogong High Plains, near Falls Creek, Victoria, Australia, a winter ski resort.

The dam was created for the Kiewa Hydroelectric Scheme, owned and operated by AGL Energy. The dam is also utilised in snow making in winter for the Falls Creek ski resort.

See also 
Kiewa River
Kiewa Hydroelectric Scheme

Notes

Victorian Alps
Dams in Victoria (Australia)